
In stratigraphy, paleontology, geology, and geobiology an erathem is the total stratigraphic unit deposited during a certain corresponding span of time during an era in the geologic timescale.

It can therefore be used as a chronostratigraphic unit of time which delineates a large span of years – less than a geological eon, but greater than its successively smaller and more refined subdivisions (geologic periods, epochs, and geologic ages). By 3,500 million years ago (Mya) simple life had developed on earth (the oldest known microbial fossils in Australia are dated to this figure).<ref
name="Rockmans" /> The atmosphere was a mix of noxious and poisonous gases (methane, ammonia, sulfur compounds, etc. – a so-called reducing atmosphere lacking much free oxygen which was bound up in compounds).

These simple organisms, cyanobacteria ruled the still cooling earth for approximately a billion years and gradually transformed the atmosphere to one containing free oxygen. These changes, along with tectonic activity left chemical trails (red bed formation, etc.) and other physical clues (magnetic orientation, layer formation factors) in the rock record, and it is these changes along with the later richer fossil record which specialists use to demarcate times early in planet earth's history in various disciplines.

Erathems are not often used in practice. While they are subdivisions of eonothems and are themselves subdivided into systems, dating experts prefer the finer resolution of smaller spans of time when evaluating strata.

Erathems have the same names as their corresponding eras. The Phanerozoic eonothem can thus be divided into Cenozoic, Mesozoic, and Paleozoic erathems. Similarly, the Proterozoic eonothem is divided youngest to oldest into the Neoproterozoic, Mesoproterozoic and Paleoproterozoic erathems, and the Archean eon and eonothem are divided similarly into the Neoarchean, Mesoarchean, Paleoarchean and the Eoarchean, for which a lower (oldest) limit is undefined.

See also

Multidiscipline comparison

Related other topics
Body form
European Mammal Neogene
Geologic time scale
New Zealand geologic time scale
North American Land Mammal Age
Fauna (animals)
Type locality
List of GSSPs

Notes

References

 Hedberg, H.D., (editor), International stratigraphic guide: A guide to stratigraphic classification, terminology, and procedure, New York, John Wiley and Sons, 1976 
 International Stratigraphic Chart from the International Commission on Stratigraphy
 US National Park Service description of geographic time
 Washington State University description of geographic time
 Web Geological Time Machine
 Eon or Aeon, Math Words – An alphabetical index

External links
The Global Boundary Stratotype Section and Point (GSSP): overview
Chart of The Global Boundary Stratotype Sections and Points (GSSP): chart
Geotime chart displaying geologic time periods compared to the fossil record – Deals with chronology and classifications for laymen (not GSSPs)

 
Chronostratigraphy
.
Geochronology
Geologic time scales
Geology terminology
Geological units
Historical geology
Paleogeography
Stratigraphy